Rebecca Blaikie is a Canadian politician, who served as president of the New Democratic Party (NDP) from 2011 to 2016.

She is the daughter of Bill Blaikie, a former NDP Member of Parliament from Winnipeg, deputy leader of the party, and provincial cabinet minister. Her brother Daniel Blaikie was elected as Member of Parliament for their father's former riding of Elmwood—Transcona in 2015.

She has an undergraduate degree in Canadian social history from the University of Winnipeg and a graduate degree in community economic development from Concordia University's School of Community and Public Affairs.

Candidate for the New Democratic Party 
Blaikie was a candidate for the NDP in the 2004 Canadian federal election in then-Prime Minister Paul Martin's electoral district of LaSalle—Émard in Montreal, Quebec. She received 4.97 per cent of the vote share, and was not elected. She did however receive a large amount of press coverage.

As executive director of the party's Quebec wing, she was one of the architects of Thomas Mulcair's historic victory in the 2007 Outremont by-election and was widely credited with setting the groundwork for the party's historic breakthrough in the province in the 2011 election.

She then returned to Manitoba to work for the provincial government. She ran in the 2011 federal election in the district of Winnipeg North, receiving 35.41 per cent of the vote, narrowly losing to Kevin Lamoureux of the Liberal Party by 44 votes (0.17 per cent).

NDP treasurer and president 
Blaikie was elected treasurer of the NDP at the Halifax convention in 2009 and reelected at the Vancouver convention in 2011, alongside Brian Topp who had been elected president. After Jack Layton's death, Topp resigned as party president to run in the leadership race. As the party's federal council may fill vacancies with one of its own members, it chose Blaikie to fill the seat of president. Blaikie was re-elected as president at the 2013 Montreal convention.

One of Blaikie's first notable acts as party president was to preside over the 2012 leadership election.

Her term as president of the NDP ended in 2016. At the party's convention in April 2016, Marit Stiles was selected as her successor.

Electoral  history

References

Living people
Canadian people of Scottish descent
Canadian political consultants
Concordia University alumni
Manitoba candidates for Member of Parliament
New Democratic Party candidates for the Canadian House of Commons
Politicians from Winnipeg
Presidents of the New Democratic Party of Canada
Quebec candidates for Member of Parliament
University of Winnipeg alumni
Year of birth missing (living people)